Robert Cicchini  is an American film and television actor and director.

Among Cicchini's film appearances are his roles as Lou Pennino, Vincent Corleone's bodyguard, in The Godfather Part III (1990), Bill Guidone in Light Sleeper (1992), Jimmy Ozio in Primary Colors (1998), and Mitch Casper in The Watcher (2000).

On television he has played recurring roles on Maybe This Time (as Nick Sr.), Providence (as Alex Mendoza), 24 (as Howard Bern) and Six Feet Under (as Todd). Other television appearances include episodes of Law & Order, ER, Chicago Hope, The Sopranos, NYPD Blue, Gilmore Girls, CSI: Crime Scene Investigation, Everybody Hates Chris and others.

Filmography

External links

American male film actors
American male television actors
Living people
Male actors from Michigan
Year of birth missing (living people)